Shadows of the Past is the debut album by the Finnish metal band Sentenced. It was released in 1991 and reissued by Century Media in 1995, including the Journey to Pohjola demo. It was reissued again in 2001 with North from Here and again in 2008 as a two-CD set along with their first two demos.

Shadows of the Past features more prominent death metal elements than would be present later in their career. On the introduction speech of North from Here 2008 re-release, Jarva states that at the time of Shadows of the Past the band was just a "Death clone" amongst others, so the band chose to pursue a more technical and personal-sounding direction on their second album.

The album has had three different covers: the original release drawn by Luxi Lahtinen, the Century Media 1995 reissue drawn by Taneli Jarva, and the 2008 reissue which is a reproduction of a medieval woodcut print. This version also includes an insert featuring the first two covers.

Track listing

1995 reissue bonus tracks

2008 reissue bonus disc

When Death Joins Us (demo 1990) 
"Hallucinations" – 2:20
"When Death Joins Us" – 4:54
"Shadows of the Past" – 4:24
"Obscurity ..." – 5:10
"Desperationed Future" – 4:29

Rotting Ways to Misery (demo 1991) 
"Rotting Ways to Misery" – 5:42
"Disengagement" – 6:18
"Suffocated Beginning of Life" – 6:15
"Under the Suffer" – 5:16
"Descending Curtain of Death" – 5:34
"The Truth" – 5:28

Credits 
Miika Tenkula – lead guitar, vocals
Sami Lopakka – guitar
Taneli Jarva – bass
Vesa Ranta – drums

References

Sentenced albums
1991 debut albums